in Shinto are tutelary kami of one's birthplace.

Overview 
In Shinto, a guardian deity of the land of one's birth.  It is believed to be a deity that protects you from before you are born until after you die, and that it will protect you throughout your life even if you move to another place.

While the relationship between Ujigami and Ujiko is based on blood relations, that between Ubusunagami and Ubuko is based on a sense of faith based on geographical relations. Therefore, it is in a city that this consciousness is strongly expressed. For example, in Kyoto, the unity of clan groups weakened, and a sense of community based on geographical ties was formed, and in the Middle Ages, powerful Shinto shrines such as Inari Shrine, Goryo Shrine, Kamo Shrine, and Kitano Shrine were established. Here the concept of birthplace area was developed based on the god of birthplace. The term birthplace pilgrimage came into general use, and the custom of paying a visit to the birthplace for a child's Miyamairi, coming-of-age ceremony, Shichi-Go-San, etc. became popular. In addition, in Edo, Hiezanou was regarded as the birthplace deity of the Tokugawa clan, and its rituals were extremely grand.

Ubusunagami are distinct from Chinjugami because one maintains the link to their Ubusunagami throughout their entire life, even if they move to a new location.

Nonetheless Ubusunagami, Ujigami, and Chinjugami are often conflated in the modern day, all three are seen as strengthening local identity.

In some locations, the ubusunagami is linked to the ubugami, a tutelary deity of infants and pregnant women; in these cases, it is customary to pay respects immediately following childbirth at a hokora to the deity.

Since the Muromachi period, the belief in the Ujigami as a family deity is declining nationwide and is being absorbed by the newly emerged belief in the Ubusunagami and Chinjugami.

See also 
 Chinjugami
 Ujigami

References

Bibliography 

 

Tutelary deities
Japanese folk religion
Shinto shrines
Japanese gods
Shinto
Shinto kami
Shinto terminology
Pages with unreviewed translations